Georgios Kafantaris (alternative spellings: Kafandaris; 13 October 1873 – 28 August 1946) was a Greek politician, born in Anatoliki Fragkista, Evrytania.

Biography
On 9 January 1919, Kafantaris joined the Cabinet of Greece under Prime Minister of Greece Eleftherios Venizelos as Minister of Agriculture. He went on to disagree with him as far as holding the 1920 Greek legislative election while the Hellenic Army was still involved in the Greco-Turkish War. Venizelos accepted his resignation on 4 February 1920.

In the elections that ensued, Venizelos' Liberal Party was ousted. Kafantaris left the country for French Third Republic and the Kingdom of Italy.

He only returned following the defeat of Greece in the Greco-Turkish War and was named Minister of Justice. On 19 February 1924, Prime Minister Eleftherios Venizelos resigned due to health reasons and nominated Kafantaris as his successor. Kafantaris served as Prime Minister for almost a month and then resigned himself on 12 March 1924 after a failed assassination attempt. He was succeeded by Alexandros Papanastasiou.

Kafantaris opposed the dictatorship of Theodoros Pangalos and, after its overthrow, served several governments as Minister of Finance.

He died in Athens in 1946, and is buried in the First Cemetery of Athens.

External links
 Listing of Greek Ministers of Agriculture since 1917, including Kafantaris

1873 births
1946 deaths
20th-century prime ministers of Greece
People from Evrytania
Liberal Party (Greece) politicians
Democratic Coalition (Greece) politicians
Finance ministers of Greece
Prime Ministers of Greece
Agriculture ministers of Greece
Greek MPs 1936
Burials at the First Cemetery of Athens
Justice ministers of Greece